Hoplistocerus is a genus of beetles in the family Cerambycidae, containing the following species:

 Hoplistocerus bonsae Lane, 1966
 Hoplistocerus callioides Gounelle, 1906
 Hoplistocerus dichrous Gounelle, 1906
 Hoplistocerus dives Bates, 1875
 Hoplistocerus gemmatus Bates, 1874
 Hoplistocerus iheringi Gounelle, 1906
 Hoplistocerus lanei Zajciw, 1960
 Hoplistocerus prominulosus Lane, 1950
 Hoplistocerus purpureoviridis Lane, 1938
 Hoplistocerus refulgens Blanchard in Orbigny, 1847

References

Anisocerini